Gonzalo Matias Rios (born 30 January 1992 in San Rafael) is an Argentine football striker who plays for Central Norte.

Career

León
Club León announced on 2 February 2015 that Ríos would be joining the team in a season-long loan from Boca Unidos.
On 21 February 2015, Ríos made his debut with Club León in the Liga MX against CF Pachuca coming in as a substitute at minute 56' for Miguel Sabah.
On 29 November 2015, a day after being eliminated in the semi-finals of the Liga MX Apertura 2015 by Club América, current manager Juan Antonio Pizzi announced that Ríos' loan had expired and he would be returning to Boca Unidos.

References

External links
 

1992 births
Living people
Footballers from Rosario, Santa Fe
Argentine people of Basque descent
Argentine footballers
Argentine expatriate footballers
Association football forwards
Argentine Primera División players
Primera Nacional players
Torneo Federal A players
Liga MX players
Boca Unidos footballers
Quilmes Atlético Club footballers
Club León footballers
Club Atlético Temperley footballers
Central Norte players
Audax Italiano footballers
Argentine expatriate sportspeople in Chile
Expatriate footballers in Chile
Argentine expatriate sportspeople in Mexico
Expatriate footballers in Mexico